Bad Bonn Kilbi is an annual, three-day open air music festival in Düdingen, Switzerland since 1991. The festival has a focus on alternative rock music; primarily those related to experimental rock, noise rock and other avant-garde genres. The festival takes place in the last week of May and often has a line up which overlaps with the Primavera Sound festival, (Barcelona) and Villette Sonique festival, (Paris) that also take place on the same weekend.

2009 lineup

2010 lineup

2011 lineup

2012 lineup

2013 lineup

Thursday 23 May 2013
 My Bloody Valentine
 Jozef van Wissem & Jim Jarmusch x SQÜRL
 Dan Deacon
 Tinariwen
 Thee Oh Sees
 Dark Dark Dark
 Kurt Vile & the Violators
 A Crashed Blackbird Called Rosehip
 Dj Fitz
 Domi Chansorn
 Trottles of the Dead
 Dead Bunny
 One Sentence. Supervisor

Friday 24 May 2013
 Grizzly Bear
 Liars
 Connan Mockasin
 Fucked Up
 Pantha du Prince
 Sóley
 Mozes and the Firstborn
 Peter Swanson
 Rebuilding the Rights of Statues
 Rotkeller
 Pandour
 Minimetal
 Dj Marcelle - Another Nice Mess
 Evelinn Trouble
 Mother Razorblade

Saturday 25 May 2013
 The Flaming Lips
 Gold Panda
 Death Grips
 Jandek
 Allah-Las
 Andy Stott
 Valgeir Sigurðsson
 White Fence
 Bass Drum of Death
 SKIP&DIE
 Dj Fett
 Golden Diskó Ship
 Camera
 Trust
 Julian Sartorius
 Grand Atlas Mondial
 Pony del Sol
 Speck

2014 lineup

Thursday 29 May 2014
 Black Lips
 Wild Beasts
 Superchunk
 Jungle
 Acid Arab
 Bombino
 Wooden Shjips
 Hospitality
 Forest Swords
 Larry Gus
 Praed
 Puts Marie
 Dj Fitz
 Lee Schornoz & Michel Gorski
 Trottles of the Dead
 Totemaus
 Mrs. Burroughs

Friday 30 May 2014
 Mogwai
 Goat
 Angel Olsen
 Pond
 R. Stevie Moore
 Nisennenmondai
 Nadine Shah
 Son Lux
 Com Truise
 Phèdre
 Dj Marcelle - Another Nice Mess
 Feldermelder
 Kotra
 Zavoloka
 Hubeskyla
 Leon
 Fell
 Mrs. Burroughs

Saturday 31 May 2014
 Neutral Milk Hotel
 Diamond Version
 Jagwar Ma
 Meridian Brothers
 The Monsters
 Birth of Joy
 Rodrigo Amarante
 Scarlett O'Hanna
 Selvhenter
 Forks
 Dim Grimm / Dimlite
 Mir
 Wolfman
 Egopusher
 Dj Fett
 Toronaut
 Mrs. Burroughs
 Rocky Wood

2015 lineup

Thursday 28 May 2015
Wand
Tanya Tagaq
Nils Frahm
The Black Angels
Optimo
Duck Duck Grey Duck
Klaus Johann Grobe
Orchestre Tout Puissant Marcel Duchamp
Thee Oh Sees
Mac DeMarco
Schnellertollermeier
Mr. Airplane Man
Alien Nightlife - The Sound of the Extraterrestrials
Verveine
Dj Fitz
Dj Fett

Friday 29 May 2015
POW!
Steve Gunn
Bo Ningen
Selda feat. Boom Pam
Circle
None of Them
Hailu Mergia with Tony Buck & Mike Majkowski
Puts Marie
Sleaford Mods
Baths
Mary Lattimore & Jeff Zeigler
Monoski
Tomaga
Salut c'est cool
Lee Gamble
Mira & Chris Schwarzwalder

Saturday 30 May 2015
Lorenzo Senni
The Slow Show
Noura Mint Seymali
DakhaBrakha
The Thurston Moore Band
Golden Teacher
Robbing Millions
Shabazz Palaces
Arthur Russell's Instrumentals directed by Peter Gordon
Viet Cong
Zebra Katz
Lord Kesseli & the Drums
Fumaça Preta
Morgan Delt
Remi
Vessel
Dj Marcelle

2016 lineup

Thursday 2 June 2016
S S S S
Ogoya Nengo & The Dodo Women S Group	
Boredoms
Ty Segall & The Muggers
Feldermelder	
Föllakzoid
Stanley Brinks & The Wave Pictures & Freschard
Julia Holter
Pyrit	
Insanlar	
Knöppel	
Papaya Fuzz	
Horizon Liquide
Gaia
Zaperlipopette	
Dj Fett

Friday 3 June 2016
Silver Firs
Cate Le Bon
Parquet Courts
Floating Points
Minor Victories
Powell
Sauna Youth	
Jenny Hval	
Pissed Jeans
Fat White Family
No Zu	
La Tene	
The Homesick
Axel Flovent	
Isolated Lines	
S S S S
A Love From Outer Space

Saturday 4 June 2016
Manuel Troller
Car Seat Headrest
Protomartyr
Kamasi Washington	
Savages
Ash Ra Tempel Experience Feat. Manuel Göttsching, Ariel Pink, Oren Ambarchi	
Metz
Beach Slang
Cakes da Killa
Herr Wempe
Ata Kak	
Ninos Du Brasil	
Odd Beholder
Augenwasser	
Sister Iodine	
Dieb13
Dollkraut
Container
Dj Marcelle

2017 lineup

Friday 2 June 2017
Sleep
Angel Olsen
Jacques
Flamingods
Puce Mary
Idris Ackamoor & the Pyramids
N.M.O.
Afrirampo
Norberto Lobo	
Lord Kesseli and the Drums	
Lena Willikens	
Yak
DUBAI Sprinters
Pure Mania
UFO feat. DIM GRIMM
H E X
DJ Three Four

Saturday 3 June 2017
The Moonlandingz
OOIOO
This Is Not This Heat
Princess Nokia
Oliver Coates
Mandolin Sisters
Not Waving	
Xylouris White
KOKOKO!
Ultimate Painting
Dengue Dengue Dengue!
Nahawa Doumbia	
PILL
Böse Wicht and his Böse Monsters
Moody
DJ Marcelle
Galopp
Julian Sartorius	
Allandy Shanty

Sunday 4 June 2017
King Gizzard & the Lizard Wizard
Anna Meredith
Gaika
Kaitlyn Aurelia Smith
Weyes Blood
Khidja	
Show Me the Body
Mitski
Schnellertollermeier
Jessy Lanza
One Sentence. Supervisor
Mdou Moctar
Jlin
Pandour	
infinite bisous
AUTISTI (Louis Jucker & Emilie Zoé)
White Wine
DJ Fett
Allandy Shanty
Saaleek
Phil Hayes & The Trees
Julian Sartorius

2018 lineup

Thursday 31 May 2018
Deerhunter
Exploded View
John Maus
Tshegue
Nick Hakim
Nihiloxica
Warmduscher
UUUU
Bonaventure	
AIR LQD
Peter Conradin Zumthor
Golden Dawn Arkestra
Jimi Jules & Kalabrese
Gibraltar Vacuum
Stella Chiweshe
Ester Poly
Alois
Lautsprecher Orchester Freiburg presents "Zweikommasieben plays Brendan Dougherty's Economy and Failure"

Friday 1 June 2018
James Holden & the Animal Spirits 
The Mystery of the Bulgarian Voices ft. Lisa Gerrard
Khruangbin
Caterina Barbieri
La Tène + Guests
Downtown Boys
Reverend Beat-Man & the New Wave
Vagabon
Andrew Weatherall
Isolated Lines
Lido Pimienta
Harvey Rushmore & the Octopus
Ziúr
Hanreti
Savage Grounds
Pony
Melissa Kassab
Schubot/Gradinger
Lautsprecher Orchester Freiburg presents Dave Philips

Saturday 2 June 2018
Sevdaliza
Horse Lords
Pan Daijing
AHMED - New Jazz Imagination
Flat Worms
Midnight Sister
Injury Reserve
Giant Swan
The Master Musicians of Jajouka led by Bachir Attar
Nadah El Shazly
DJ Marcelle
Here Lies Man
Deena Abdelwahed
FAKA
Orchestre les Mangelepa
East Sister
Friendly Fire
DJ Fett
Melissa Kassab
Schubot/Gradinger
Lautsprecher Orchester Freiburg presents d'incise

2019 lineup

2021 lineup

Friday 3 September 2021
Anika
Convulsif
Crème Solaire
DJ Marcelle
Duma
Francis Eggs
Lalalar
Lautsprecher Orchester Freiburg presents DJ Marcelle
Marcel De Sie
Maria w Horn
Mathis Neuhaus
Nina Garcia - Antoine Chessex - Louis Schild
NVST B2B Mona
Schnellertollermeier

Saturday 4 September 2021
Dam Area
Feldermelder
Goffbaby
Horse Lords
Hubeskyla
Jacob Hannes
Leoni Leoni
Lyra Pramuk
Lautsprecher Orchester Freiburg presents Lucas Monème & Benu Zitz
Mathis Neuhaus
MOESHA 13
Nina Harker
Noria Lilt
Ozan Ata Canani & Karaba
 Peter Kernel
Subito Zeitlos
Zelgstrasse 43

Sunday 5 September 2021
Alpha Maid
Bbymutha
Bitter Moon & After 5:08
damelove
DJ Fett
Elischa Heller
Heimat
Julian Sartorius
Kraake
Lala &Ce
Lautsprecher Orchester Freiburg presents Musique Infinie
Mathis Neuhaus
Omni Selassi
Yalla Miku

2022 lineup

Friday 3 June 2022
Aksak Maboul
Baby Volcano
BASSINÄ
Beatrice Dillon
Big Joanie
Billy Nomates
Brutalismus 3000
Crack Cloud
DECHA
Delish Da Goddess
DJ Marcelle
Elischa Heller DJ Set
État Des Choses
IDLES
Loraine James
Los Bitchos
Lucas Monème
model home
OneFootStep
Turkana

Saturday 4 June 2022
Alice
Curl
DJ Fett
État Des Choses
Ethyos 440
Eve Owen
Gilla Band
Insomnia Isterica
Joyful Seeorchester
Kamaal Williams
Kampire
Kit Sebastian
L'Rain
Los Pashminas
LOUIS JUCKER & BAND
Lucas Monème
Machine Girl
MC Yallah & Debmaster
R. Daneel Olivaw
Senyawa
Sharon Van Etten
UFO ft Claire Huguenin & Marlon McNeill
Völlig losgelöst!

Sunday 5 June 2022
Arquebine Linnett
Big Freedia
Black Country, New Road
Dry Cleaning
État Des Choses
Film 2
Gabber Modus Operandi
Jerusalem in My Heart
Joyful Seeorchester
Kelman Duran
Leoni Leoni hybrid
Lex Amor
Lucas Monème
NÂR
Oklou
OKO DJ
Slikback
Squid
Still House Plants
Surfbort
Vanligt Folk
VÍz
Zimmermann-Svosve-Grab

2023 lineup

Thursday 1 June 2023
Alto Fuero
Amnesia Scanner
Backxwash
Disco Doom
fulmine
Jockstrap
Lazza Gio
Marara Kelly
Michelle Gurevich
MinReCuliao
Muovipussi
Musique Infinie
Noria Lilt
Soul Glo
Surprise Chef
The Chats
Veronica Vasicka

Friday 2 June 2023
070 Shake
Ambassade
BABY VOLCANO + FAMILIA EXPANDIDAAA
Blackhaine
Chupame El Dedo
CLAMM
Courtesy
DEBONAIR
DJ Marcelle
DJ Travella
LustSickPuppy
M(h)aol
Milla Pluton
Moin
Muovipussi
Neuerdings
Sessa
Sudden Infant
Taimashoe
The Comet Is Coming

Saturday 3 June 2023
Citron Citron
DEBONAIR
Deli Girls
DJ Fett
Donna Candy
EGG IDIOT
Gnod
HAAi
Jana Rush
Kalabrese
Lael Neale
Manuel Troller
Marina Herlop
Mark Ernestus' Ndagga Rhythm Force
Muovipussi
NOI NOI
Ocen James & Rian Treanor
Stefanie Stauffacher
Σtella

References

External links
 Official Website

Music festivals in Switzerland
Electronic music festivals in Switzerland
Music festivals established in 1991
Spring (season) events in Switzerland
1991 establishments in Switzerland
Canton of Fribourg